Kim Ji-sook (born July 18, 1990), known mononymously as Jisook, is a South Korean singer and actress. She is a former member of South Korean girl group Rainbow.

Early life and education 
Kim graduated from Changhyeon High School . She was active in a rock band while in high school and won the top prize for singing at the Suwon General Arts Festival. At a practical music academy, she joined Rainbow at the recommendation of Kim Sung-hee, a former member of Kara. Kim graduated from Hanyang Women's University, also Kim Sung-hee's alma mater.

Career

2009–2016: Rainbow 

On November 12, 2009, Rainbow released their first music video "Gossip Girl", alongside their EP of the same name. On January 12, 2012, Kim debuted as a member of the Rainbow subunit Rainbow Pixie alongside groupmates Seungah and Hyunyoung with "Hoi Hoi". 

In June 2012, Kim released "Shall We Fall in Love?" for the soundtrack of I Love Lee Taly with Min Hoon-ki. 

Kim was the 2015 Gyeonggi Provincial Police Agency (now Gyeonggi Provincial Southern Provincial Police Agency) Public Relations Ambassador. 

On October 27, 2016, it was confirmed that Rainbow would disband on November 12 with the end of the members' contracts.

2017–present: Solo debut, acting, and Rainbow reunion 
On February 15, 2017, Dmost Entertainment announced that Kim had signed with them.

In August 2017, Kim made her solo debut with Baesisi, the title track of the same name featuring BTOB's Jung Il-hoon. In January 2019, DMOST stated that Kim was to make a comeback the next month.

In November 2019, Rainbow reformed on the group's tenth anniversary. They released the EP Over the Rainbow on November 14.

In 2021, Kim was cast in Imitation, a television series about idols in the entertainment industry, as Eun-jin, a talented stylist.

Personal life 
Kim's mother passed away in 2012 of an undisclosed illness; her mother had hidden the severity of the illness as Kim had been promoting at the time. 

Kim enjoys photography. She took the debut profile pictures for I.B.I, a girl group formed by five former Produce 101 contestants. Kim also held a charity gallery from February 5 to February 25, 2015, at Gallery Illum in the Chungmuro district of downtown Seoul.

Kim was cast with boyfriend Lee Doohee  in Don't Be Jealous . They announced their marriage plans for on the show; they later announced the date as October 31, 2020.

Discography

Singles

Soundtrack appearances

Filmography

Television series

References

External links 

Kim Ji-sook STARIT Entertainment Website

1990 births
Living people
K-pop singers
South Korean female idols
South Korean women pop singers
South Korean dance musicians
South Korean television actresses
South Korean television personalities
South Korean web series actresses
Rainbow (girl group)
DSP Media artists